Giuseppe Tonutti (March 19, 1925 – July 23, 2018) was an Italian politician who served as a Senator from 1976 to 1987. He was member of the Christian Democracy.

Biography 
Tonutti was born in Udine, Italy on March 19, 1925.

Tonutti was elected to the Italian Senate as a member of the Christian Democrats in 1979 and stayed in office for 3 legislatures, until 1987.

Outside of politics, Tonutti worked in the business world, serving at one point as president of the Savings Bank of Friuli Venezia Giulia.

Tonutti died in Fagagna, Italy on July 22, 2018.

External links 

 Italian Senate Page

References

1925 births
2018 deaths
Christian Democracy (Italy) politicians
Senators of Legislature VII of Italy
Senators of Legislature VIII of Italy
Senators of Legislature IX of Italy
People from Udine
20th-century Italian businesspeople
21st-century Italian businesspeople